The Zephyr Stakes was an American Thoroughbred horse race that was run from 1886 through 1910 at Sheepshead Bay Race Track in Sheepshead Bay, Brooklyn, New York. A race for two-year-olds of either sex, it was a sprint race run on dirt. During its tenure, it was run at three different distances. From inception through 1900 it was run on the track's Futurity course at  furlongs with a setup that did not accommodate a standard six-furlong race.

The 1886 inaugural Zephyr Stakes was won by Tremont. Considered one of the great two-year-old horses in the history of American racing, Tremont's thirteen race wins set a record for the most by an undefeated two-year-old trained in the United States. Going into 2019, that record still stands. He earned 1886 American Champion Two-Year-Old Colt honors.

On June 11, 1908, the Republican controlled New York Legislature under Governor Charles Evans Hughes passed the Hart–Agnew anti-betting legislation with penalties allowing for fines and up to a year in prison. The owners of Sheepshead Bay Race Track, and other racing facilities in New York State, struggled to stay in business without betting. Racetrack operators had no choice but to drastically reduce the purse money being paid out which by 1909 saw the Mermaid Stakes offering a purse that was close to one-tenth of what it had been in earlier years. Further restrictive legislation was passed by the New York Legislature in 1910 which deepened the financial crisis for track operators and led to a complete shut down of racing across the state during 1911 and 1912. When a Court ruling saw racing return in 1913 it was too late for the Sheepshead Bay horse racing facility and it never reopened.

Records
Speed record:
 5 ½ furlongs: 1:06.40, Disadvantage (1901)
 5 ¾ furlongs: 1:09.40, Commando (1900)

Most wins by a jockey:
 2 – Jim McLaughlin (1886, 1887)
 2 – Tod Sloan (1896, 1898)

Most wins by a trainer:
 3 – Frank McCabe (1886, 1887, 1889)
 3 – T. J. Healey (1904, 1905, 1906)

Most wins by an owner:
 3 – Dwyer Brothers Stable (1886, 1887, 1889)
 3 – Richard T. Wilson Jr. (1904, 1905, 1906)

Winners

 † In the 1897 race, Blueaway finished first but was disqualified for improper weight.

References

Flat horse races for two-year-olds
Discontinued horse races in New York City
Sheepshead Bay Race Track
Recurring sporting events established in 1886
Recurring sporting events disestablished in 1910
1886 establishments in New York (state)
1910 disestablishments in New York (state)